Serine/threonine-protein phosphatase 2A 56 kDa regulatory subunit delta isoform is an enzyme that in humans is encoded by the PPP2R5D gene. Mutations in PPP2R5D cause Jordan's Syndrome.

Function 
The product of this gene belongs to the phosphatase 2A regulatory subunit B family. Protein phosphatase 2A is one of the four major Ser/Thr phosphatases, and it is implicated in the negative control of cell growth and division. It consists of a common heteromeric core enzyme, which is composed of a catalytic subunit and a constant regulatory subunit, that associates with a variety of regulatory subunits. The B regulatory subunit might modulate substrate selectivity and catalytic activity. This gene encodes a delta isoform of the regulatory subunit B56 subfamily. Alternatively spliced transcript variants encoding different isoforms have been identified.

Interactions 
PPP2R5D has been shown to interact with:
 HAND2, 
 PPP2CA,
 PPP2R1B,  and
 liprin-alpha-1.

References

Further reading